Laško Brewery is the largest brewery in  Slovenia. It is located in Laško and named after the town.

The brewery was founded in 1825 by Franz Geyer, a gingerbread baker and mead producer. After World War II ended in 1945, Laško was the fifth-largest in Yugoslavia, and by 1991 it was the largest among 28 Yugoslav breweries. It lost much of the Yugoslav market in 1991 after Slovenia declared independence and during the resulting Ten-Day War, although sales rebounded during the 1990s.

In 2016 Laško and Union were formally merged into Pivovarna Laško Union d.d. under the Owner Heineken.

History of brewing in Laško 
In 1825, the physician and lecturer Franz Geyer set up a craft brewery in the former Valvasor Hospital (1st location - today's Hotel Savinja), where the first brewer in Laška probably brewed stone beer (Steinbier), which was otherwise known in Carinthia, for thirteen years. However, it is not known whether he did not know how to make technologically more demanding Bavarian beer as well. 

In 1838, the brewery was bought by Heinrich August Uhlich, who gave Laška beer a real reputation. As the owner of the bathhouse in Rimske Toplice, he must have served his beer to foreign guests as well and, due to his origin in Trieste, drove it to Trieste, a commercial center with connoisseurs of good food and drink. He also proved to be an enterprising wholesaler, as his beer was drunk even in Alexandria and Calcutta.  

Pivovarna Laško during the time of Simon Kukac in 1898.  

The next owner, Anton Larisch, built in 1867 at the foot of St. Kristofa and Šmihel (2nd location - former Volna) new brewery, which at the time was the largest in Spodnji Štajersko. He was famous for the fact that he personally controlled the quality of the beer and even improved it, and he also increased the capacity of the brewery.   

In 1889, the brewery was bought by Simon Kukec, a brewer from Žal, a strongly Slovene-oriented nationalist. Because he was a good organizer, financier, businessman, and on top of that he was particularly fond of innovations, he is considered the most important figure in the history of the Laška brewery. He established a new type of beer and the first beer brand - thermal beer, which still lives today in its derivative form. Through many experiments, he found that thermal water improves the taste of beer. As a good entrepreneur, he was aware of the need to attract customers with unusual innovations. Therefore, he started to brew thermal beer as light and dark, and in both cases it was also stronger than ordinary beer.

Brands
Laško
Zlatorog
Eliksir
Dark
Light
Jubilejnik
Club
Trim
Malt
Radler

Bandidos
Cuba Libre
Ice
Tequila
Sun

iC Cider

Oda water

Laško Group also owns a few country's most known beverage companies, including:

Pivovarna Union d.d. - the country's second largest brewery with headquarters in the capital city Ljubljana. The brewing of Union beer decided to be replaced from Ljubljana to Laško.
Radenska d.d. - the country`s largest water manufacturer, which produces the world famous mineral water - Radenska. Company's headquarters is in city of Radenci
Vital Mestinje d.o.o. - soft drinks manufacturer. Company's headquarters is in city of Podplat

The Group has also some other subsidiaries, but owns less than 50% of the companies: Mercator, Delo, Slovita, Jadranska pivovara, RA&LA and Firma Del.

The brewery participates in the annual summertime Festival of Beer & Flowers (Pivo-Cvetje) in Laško, one of the most popular events for tourists in the country.

References

External links 

Laško Brewery

Breweries in Slovenia
1825 establishments in Europe
Brewery
Slovenian brands
Heineken brands